The 1909–10 FA Cup was the 39th season of the world's oldest association football competition, the Football Association Challenge Cup (more usually known as the FA Cup). Newcastle United won the competition for the first time, beating Barnsley 2–0 in the replay of the final at Goodison Park in Liverpool, through two goals from Albert Shepherd. The first match, held at Crystal Palace, London, was a 1–1 draw.

Matches were scheduled to be played at the stadium of the team named first on the date specified for each round, which was always a Saturday. If scores were level after 90 minutes had been played, a replay would take place at the stadium of the second-named team later the same week. If the replayed match was drawn further replays would be held at neutral venues until a winner was determined. If scores were level after 90 minutes had been played in a replay, a 30-minute period of extra time would be played.

Calendar
The format of the FA Cup for the season had two preliminary rounds, five qualifying rounds, four proper rounds, and the semi finals and final.

First round proper
39 of the 40 clubs from the First and Second divisions joined the 12 clubs who came through the qualifying rounds. Of the League sides, only Lincoln City were entered instead at the Fourth Qualifying Round, losing to Crewe Alexandra in the fourth qualifying round. Twelve non-league clubs won through to the first round proper.

Thirteen non-league sides were given byes to the first round to bring the total number of teams up to 64. These were:

32 matches were scheduled to be played on Saturday, 15 January 1910. Ten matches were drawn and went to replays in the following midweek fixture, of which one went to a second replay.

Second round proper
The 16 second-round matches were played on Saturday, 5 February 1910. Three matches were drawn, with the replays taking place in the following midweek fixture.

Third round proper
The eight third-round matches were scheduled for Saturday, 19 February 1910. There was one replay, between QPR and West Ham United, played in the following midweek fixture.

Fourth round proper
The four fourth-round matches were scheduled for Saturday, 5 March 1910. There were no replays.

Semi finals

The semi-final matches were played on Saturday, 26 March 1910. Newcastle United and Barnsley won, going on to meet each other in the final.

Replay

Final

The Final was contested by Newcastle United and Barnsley. The first game resulted in a score draw at Crystal Palace. Two goals scored by Albert Shepherd for Newcastle won the replay at Goodison Park.

Match details

Replay

See also
FA Cup Final Results 1872-

References
General
Official site; fixtures and results service at TheFA.com
1909-10 FA Cup at rsssf.com
1909-10 FA Cup at soccerbase.com

Specific

1909-10
FA
Cup